Fultodromia is a genus of crabs within the family Dromiidae, with 2 species currently assigned to the genus.

Species 

 Fultodromia nodipes 
 Fultodromia spinifera

References 

Dromiacea
Decapod genera